The Bottom of Chaos is an album by Japanese rock band Rentrer en Soi. It was released on August 1, 2007 in Japan and on September 28 in Europe.

Track listing 

Disc two (European edition only)
 "Just Mad Pain" – 4:22

Personnel 
Toshiro Honkawa – recording, mixing
Toshiaki Ishii – recording, mixing
Takahiro Uchida – mastering
Kyo – vocal coach (referred to as "agitator")
Daisuke (Kagerou) – vocal coach
Dynamite Tommy – executive producer

Notes 
The title of "I Hate Myself and Want to Die" is an homage to Nirvana's song of the same name.

References 

2007 albums
Rentrer en Soi albums